Vasıf Arzumanov (born August 6, 1988) is a Turkish wrestler with Azeri origin, who has won a bronze medal in the 2010 World Wrestling Championships, in his first senior championship.

2010 World Championship – Bronze medal
 Round 1: Bye
 Round 2: Defeated , 2-1(0-2, 2–0, 1–0)
 Round 3: Defeated , 2–1 (0-1, 2–0, 1–0)
 Round 4: Defeated , 2–0 (1–0, 6–0)
 3rd Place: Defeated , 2–0 (3–0, 2–0)

References
 
The Official Website of the Moscow 2010 World Championship

External links
 

Living people
Turkish male sport wrestlers
Turkish people of Azerbaijani descent
Naturalized citizens of Turkey
1988 births
Azerbaijani emigrants to Turkey
World Wrestling Championships medalists